Motion Picture is the tenth studio album by Swiss electronic duo Yello. The record was released on 14 December 1999 via Mercury Records.

Track listing 
 "Get On" – 4:27
 "Houdini" – 4:15
 "Prisoner Of His Mind" – 4:06
 "Distant Mirror" – 5:17
 "Time Freeze" – 5:05
 "Croissant Bleu" – 3:24
 "Liquid Lies" – 3:15
 "Squeeze Please" – 3:14
 "Shake And Shiver" – 4:50
 "Bubbling Under" – 5:13
 "Point Blank" – 6:13
 "Cyclops" – 4:27

Personnel
Composed, Arranged, Engineered by Boris Blank 
Lyrics, Vocals by Dieter Meier 
Rhodes Electric Piano by Gino Todesco (tracks: 5, 11)
Mastered by Kevin Metcalfe 
Graphics, Photography by Martin Wanner 
Producer – Yello 
℗ 1999 Mercury Records; © 1999 Mercury Records

References 

1999 albums
Yello albums
Mercury Records albums